Havant & Waterlooville Football Club, an association football club based in Havant, Hampshire, England, was founded in 1998 as a result of Havant Town and Waterlooville merging as one team. In the 1997–98 Southern Football League Southern Division the two teams finished in 12th and 10th respectively, so when they merged Havant & Waterlooville played in the same league the following season. In their inaugural season they won the 1998–99 Southern Football League Southern Division and gained promotion to the Southern League Premier Division where they remained until 2004. At the end of the 2003–04 season the National League System was reorganised and Havant & Waterlooville joined the Football Conference South where they have remained to the present day, in 2015 the league was renamed National League South. The club experience its first relegation at the end of the 2015–16 season finishing  in twentieth position in the twenty-four-team National League South.

Since their formation Havant & Waterlooville have also participated in three cup competitions each season, the FA Cup, the FA Trophy and the Hampshire Senior Cup (excluding 2007–08). Their furthest run in the FA Cup saw the club reach the fourth round of the 2007–08 season; the club, being in the Conference South, were drawn away to Premier League side Liverpool, they caused an upset by leading twice before eventually losing 5–2; before being drawn to face Liverpool they had already eliminated three teams from higher divisions: York City (Conference Premier), Notts County (League Two) and Swansea City (League One). Their furthest FA Trophy run has seen the club reach the semi-finals twice in 2002–03 and 2013–14. Their furthest run in the Hampshire Senior Cup saw the club reach the final four times: becoming the runners-up in 2001, 2002 and 2014; and winning the competition in 2016.

As of the 2015–16 season, the club's first team has spent twelve seasons in the sixth tier of English football, five in the seventh and one in the eighth. The table details their achievements in first-team competitions, and records their top goalscorer and average home league attendance, for each season since their first appearance in the Southern League Southern Division in 1998–99.

Key

Key to divisions
 SLS – Southern League Southern
 SLP – Southern League Premier
 Conf S – Conference South
 Nat S – National League South
 ILP – Isthmian League Premier Division
 National – National League

Key to rounds
 QR2 – Second Qualifying Round, etc.
 R1 – First Round, etc.
 QF – Quarter-finals
 SF – Semi-finals
 RU – Runner-up
 W – Winner

Key to positions and symbols
  – Champions
  – Runners-up
  – Promoted
  – Relegated

Seasons

Notes

References
General

 
 
 
 

Specific

Seasons
English football club seasons